Pruvotfolia pselliotes is a species of sea slug, an aeolid nudibranch, a marine gastropod mollusc in the family Facelinidae.

Distribution
This species was described from Le Croisic, Atlantic coast of France. It has been reported from Spain, Malta, Senegal and Turkey.

References 

Facelinidae
Gastropods described in 1923